The Isaac Neuberger House is a house located in northwest Portland, Oregon listed on the National Register of Historic Places.

See also
 National Register of Historic Places listings in Northwest Portland, Oregon

References

Houses on the National Register of Historic Places in Portland, Oregon
Tudor Revival architecture in Oregon
Houses completed in 1937
1937 establishments in Oregon
Hillside, Portland, Oregon
Portland Historic Landmarks